Epideira carinata is a species of sea snail, a marine gastropod mollusk in the family Horaiclavidae.

Description

Distribution
This marine species is endemic to Australia and occurs off New South Wales

References

carinata
Gastropods described in 1954
Gastropods of Australia